Calavorno is a village in Tuscany, central Italy, administratively a frazione of the comune of Coreglia Antelminelli, province of Lucca.

Calavorno is about 26 km from Lucca and 10 km from Coreglia Antelminelli.

References

Bibliography

External links
 
 

Frazioni of the Province of Lucca